C/2018 Y1 (Iwamoto) is a long period comet with a retrograde orbit discovered on December 18, 2018, by Japanese amateur astronomer Masayuki Iwamoto. Its period is estimated to be 1,733 years. It passed closest to Earth on February 13, 2019. It was expected to reach a magnitude of between 6.5 and 7.5, visible in binoculars or a small telescope and was reported to reach a magnitude of 5.5 by Juan Jose Gonzalez on February 13, before fading to 7.6 two weeks later.

The comet was observed by iSHELL spectrograph at the NASA Infrared Telescope Facility (IRTF). Overall, the measured spatial distributions for polar molecules (in particular, H2O and CH3OH) were broader, exhibiting more complex structure compared with nonpolar or weakly polar species (CH4, C2H6, and CO). Compositionally, compared to their respective mean abundances among comets from the Oort cloud, C2H6 and CH3OH were enriched, CH4 and HCN were near normal, and all other species were depleted. The abundance ratio CH3OH/C2H6 was higher by 45% ± 8% on January 13 versus February 5, whereas CH4/C2H6 was unchanged within the uncertainty, suggesting nonhomogeneous composition among regions of the nucleus dominating activity on these dates.

Gallery

References 

Astronomical objects discovered in 2018
Comets in 2019
Cometary object articles
Non-periodic comets